Xiaoyu is the pinyin spelling of a number of distinct Chinese masculine and feminine given names. These names are written with various Chinese characters, and may have differences in tone, so neither their pronunciations nor their meanings are identical. People with these names include:

Wang Xiaoyu (1914–1995), Chinese male politician
Zheng Xiaoyu (1944–2007), Chinese male government official executed for corruption
Stella Chung (born 1981), Malaysian female singer
Zhang Xiaoyu (shot putter) (born 1983), Chinese female shot putter
Zhang Xiaoyu (born 1985), Chinese female internet celebrity and nude model
Zhang Xiaoyu (footballer) (born 1985), Chinese male footballer
Liu Xiaoyu (swimmer) (born 1988), Chinese female swimmer
Liu Xiaoyu (basketball) (born 1989), Chinese male basketball player
Yu Xiaoyu (badminton) (born 1992), Chinese male badminton player
Liang Xiaoyu (born 1996), Singaporean female badminton player
Yu Xiaoyu (born 1996), Chinese figure female skater
Liu Xiaoyu (born 1997), Canadian classical pianist

Fictional characters with this name include:
Jiang Xiaoyu, male character from the 2002 Taiwanese television show The Legendary Siblings 2
Ling Xiaoyu, female character from the Tekken video game series

See also
Xiao Yu (574–647), Tang Dynasty official
Xiao Yu (singer) (born 1983), Taiwanese singer; Xiao Yu here means "Little Yu", and is a diminutive of his birth name Sung Nien-yu